The 2020 National League Wild Card Series were four best-of-three-games series in Major League Baseball (MLB) to determine participating teams in the 2020 National League Division Series. Because of the COVID-19 pandemic, MLB expanded the postseason instead of holding the regular Wild Card Game for each league. All games for each series were played at the higher seeded team's home ballpark.

The matchups were:
 (1) Los Angeles Dodgers (West Division champions) vs. (8) Milwaukee Brewers (second wild card): Dodgers won series, 2–0
 (2) Atlanta Braves (East Division champions) vs. (7) Cincinnati Reds (first wild card): Braves won series, 2–0
 (3) Chicago Cubs (Central Division champions) vs. (6) Miami Marlins (East Division 2nd place): Marlins won series, 2–0
 (4) San Diego Padres (West Division 2nd place) vs. (5) St. Louis Cardinals (Central Division 2nd place): Padres won series, 2–1

Because of the expanded postseason format, the National League Central became the first division in MLB history with four teams in the postseason in the same year. However, none of the four teams played each other, and all four lost their Wild Card Series, with each team losing its elimination game via a shutout.

Background
On September 15, 2020, MLB announced the playoff bracket for the 2020 season, which was shortened to 60 regular season games due to the COVID-19 pandemic. The postseason will consist of eight teams from each league: The top two teams from each division, plus the teams from each league with the next two best records. The Wild Card Series will be a best-of-three series, as opposed to the play-in game format of the Wild Card Game from previous seasons, while the Division Series, League Championship Series, and World Series will be their normal lengths. The Wild Card Series games will be played at the home field of the higher seeded team.

Matchups

Los Angeles Dodgers vs. Milwaukee Brewers

Atlanta Braves vs. Cincinnati Reds

Chicago Cubs vs. Miami Marlins

San Diego Padres vs. St. Louis Cardinals

Los Angeles vs. Milwaukee

This is the second postseason meeting between the Dodgers and Brewers. The previous meeting took place in the 2018 National League Championship Series, in which the Dodgers won in seven games.

Game 1

Game 2

Atlanta vs. Cincinnati

This is the second postseason meeting between the Braves and Reds. The previous meeting took place in the 1995 National League Championship Series, in which the Braves won in a four-game sweep.

Game 1

Game 1 matched Trevor Bauer and Max Fried. Bauer struck out 12 while allowing two Braves hits in  innings, but Fried matched him with seven innings of six-hit ball as both teams relied on the bullpens to try and carry the way, with the Braves using seven reliever and the Reds using five. Both teams would hit once with runners on scoring position, but the Reds left 13 on the bases while the Braves left nine, with the Reds leaving the bases loaded twice. In the 11th, the Reds got on with a double and two walks after two strikeouts, but Tyler Matzek struck out Mike Moustakas to end the threat. In the 13th, the Reds garnered two singles and a walk, but A.J. Minter quelled threats to score. In the bottom half, the Braves reached on singles by Nick Markakis and Austin Riley off Archie Bradley to set up for Freddie Freeman versus Amir Garrett. Freeman lined a one-out single to score the winning run.  It was the first time the Braves had won Game 1 of a postseason series since the 2001 NLDS, snapping an 0-for-10 streak.

This was the first time in MLB postseason history that a game was scoreless after 11 innings. There were also 37 strikeouts, a postseason record. This was also the first (and as it would end up, only) extra innings game of the 2020 season to not have the runner on second rule, which only applied to the regular season.

Game 2

Ian Anderson faced Luis Castillo for Game 2. Anderson would allow two hits with no runs while striking out nine for six innings while Castillo went  innings and struck out seven with one run allowed on six hits. The go-ahead run scored on a Ronald Acuña Jr. two-out double in the fifth inning. Home runs by Marcell Ozuna and Adam Duvall in the eight inning off Raisel Iglesias proved the final blow needed for the Braves to win their first postseason clincher in 19 years.  

For the sixth time in MLB history, the Reds became the fifth team to end a postseason without scoring a run, after the Indians (2013), Pirates (2014 and 2015), Yankees (2015), and Mets (2016), and the first team in MLB history to fail to score a run in a postseason series with more than one game.
This would also be only the second time a postseason series consisted entirely of shutouts after the 1905 World Series 115 years before.

Chicago vs. Miami

This is the second postseason meeting between the Cubs and Marlins. The previous meeting took place in the 2003 National League Championship Series, in which the then-Florida Marlins won in seven games after trailing the series 3–1.  Game 2, originally scheduled for October 1, was postponed due to rain.  The game was moved to October 2 and Game 3 (if necessary) to October 3.

Game 1

Game 2

Miami's first postseason series win since the 2003 World Series. 

This was many of the Cubs 2016 championship core last postseason game in Chicago, including the man who put the team together, President of Baseball Operation Theo Epstein, who mutually parted ways with the team in November.

San Diego vs. St. Louis

This is the fourth postseason meeting between the Padres and Cardinals, with the Cardinals winning all three previous meetings in the Division Series. The Cardinals swept the Padres in 1996 and 2005, while they won in four games in 2006.

Game 1

Game 2

Wil Myers and Fernando Tatis Jr. were the first teammates each to hit two home runs in a postseason game since Babe Ruth and Lou Gehrig did it in the 1932 World Series. This is the first postseason victory for the Padres at Petco Park and the first home postseason victory overall since Game 3 of the 1998 NLCS. It is also the first postseason loss for the Cardinals at Petco Park after winning the first four postseason games in the venue's history.

Game 3
 

The Padres were the first team to win an elimination game using nine pitchers.

Broadcasting
The games were televised on the ESPN family of networks in the United States, with ABC showing the entirety of the Cubs-Marlins series, with ESPN2 showing Game 1 of the Padres vs. Cardinals series and ESPN showing every other game.

See also
2020 American League Wild Card Series

References

National League Wild Card Series
Major League Baseball Wild Card Series
Los Angeles Dodgers postseason
Atlanta Braves postseason
Chicago Cubs postseason
San Diego Padres postseason
St. Louis Cardinals postseason
Miami Marlins postseason
Cincinnati Reds postseason
Milwaukee Brewers postseason
National League Wild Card Series
National League Wild Card Series
National League Wild Card Series
Sports competitions in Chicago